Club Social Deportivo León de Huánuco is a professional Peruvian football club based in the city of Huánuco. It is the biggest football club of Huánuco city. The club was founded in 1946 and play in the Copa Peru (Peruvian Third Division).

History
The club occupies the position 14 in the board accumulated of championships of First Division.

In the 1972 Copa Perú, León de Huánuco was runner-up and classified to the 1973 Torneo Descentralizado.

In the 1980 Copa Perú, León de Huánuco classified to the 1981 Torneo Descentralizado, when defeated Comercial Aguas Verdes.

In the 2000 Copa Perú, León de Huánuco classified to the National Stage, but was eliminated by Coronel Bolognesi in the semifinals.

In the 2001 Copa Perú, León de Huánuco classified to the National Stage, but was eliminated by Deportivo Bolito in the semifinals.

In the 2002 Copa Perú, León de Huánuco classified to the National Stage, but was eliminated by Atlético Universidad in the semifinals.

In the 2006 Copa Perú, León de Huánuco classified to the National Stage, but was eliminated by Sport Huamanga in the round of 16.

On December 12, 2010, at Estadio Monumental, Leon de Huanuco was defeated by Universidad San Martín de Porres in Peru's two-legged final that gave USMP the domestic championship.

Kit and badge

Rivalries
León de Huánuco has had a long-standing rivalry with Alianza Universidad.

Historic Badges

Current squad
.

Technical staff

Managers
 Franco Navarro (Jan 1, 2010–Nov 15, 2011)
 Aníbal Ruiz (Jan 4, 2012–Aug 15, 2012)
 Jean Ferrari (Aug 15, 2012–Sept 25, 2012)
 Teddy Cardama (Sept 26, 2012–Dec 31, 2012)
 Édgar Ospina (Jan 1, 2013–April 15, 2013)
 José Soto (April 17, 2013–Oct 8, 2013)
 César Chacón (Oct 8, 2013–Dec 10, 2013)
 Wilmar Valencia (Jan 1, 2014–Jul 15, 2014)
 César Chacón (Jul 15, 2014–Sept,1 2014)
 Rolando Chilavert (Sept,1 2014–)

Honours

National
Peruvian Primera División:
Runner-up (1): 2010

Copa Perú:
Winners (2): 1980, 2009
Runner-up (1): 1972

Regional
Región V:
Winners (3): 2000, 2001, 2002
Runner-up (1): 2009

Región VI:
Winners (1):  2006

Liga Departamental de Huanuco:
Winners (12): 1966, 1967, 1968, 1969, 1970, 1971, 2000, 2001, 2002, 2003, 2006, 2007
Runner-up (5): 2004, 2008, 2009, 2017, 2018

Liga Superior de Huanuco:
Runner-up (2): 2008, 2009

Liga Distrital de Huánuco:
Winners (4): 1954, 1966, 1967, 1968
Runner-up (2): 2018, 2022

Results

Performance in CONMEBOL competitions

A = appearances, P = matches played, W = won, D = drawn, L = lost, GF = goals for, GA = goals against.

See also
List of football clubs in Peru
Peruvian football league system

References

External links

 Rugidos Reales
 Liga Superior de Huánuco 2009 - Tiempo de rugir
 El CSD León de Huánuco celebra 63 años de vida institucional

Football clubs in Peru
Association football clubs established in 1946